This article lists the longest church buildings in the world as measured by various criteria.

Scope
The term church is open to interpretation and debate. However, for the purposes of this article, it will be used to mean any building which was built for the primary purpose of Christian worship, for any recognised denomination of Christianity. This includes all cathedrals (the seat of a bishop), basilicas, and other types of churches. It does not include temples of other religions, e.g. mosques, synagogues. It does include at least one building, Hagia Sophia, which was built as a church but later became a mosque (and is now a museum).

List

Note: this list is incomplete e.g. St. Mary's Cathedral, Sydney is 107 metres long (ref. St. Mary's Cathedral website). Portugal's Alcobaça Monastery is 106 metres long.

See also
List of largest church buildings
List of tallest churches
List of highest church naves
List of largest buildings
List of the largest Protestant churches

References

Longest
Churches, longest
Churches, longest
Churches, longest